Agatovo is a village in Sevlievo Municipality, Gabrovo Province, northern central Bulgaria.

References

Villages in Gabrovo Province